Michelle Carey (now Parker) (born 20 March 1981 in Dublin, Ireland) is an Irish athlete who competed at the 2012 Summer Olympics in the Women's 4 × 400 metres relay. The team lost out in the first round. She specialises in the 400 metres hurdles and represented Ireland in that event at the World Championships in Athletics in 2007 and 2009.

References

External links

1981 births
Living people
Athletes (track and field) at the 2008 Summer Olympics
Athletes (track and field) at the 2012 Summer Olympics
Irish female sprinters
Olympic athletes of Ireland
Sportspeople from Dublin (city)
Irish female hurdlers
World Athletics Championships athletes for Ireland